Caronno Varesino is a comune (municipality) in the Province of Varese in the Italian region Lombardy, located about  northwest of Milan and about  south of Varese.

Caronno Varesino borders the following municipalities: Albizzate, Carnago, Castiglione Olona, Castronno, Gornate-Olona, Morazzone, Solbiate Arno.

Demographic evolution

References

Cities and towns in Lombardy